Crush is a 1992 New Zealand drama film directed by Alison Maclean. It was winner of four film awards and was entered into the 1992 Cannes Film Festival.

Plot
While driving through New Zealand so that literary critic Christina can interview author Colin Iseman, Lane crashes their car. Christina is hospitalized with severe injuries while Lane is able to walk away with only a mild head injury.

The following day Lane goes to Colin's home where she meets Colin's teenage daughter Angela, whom she initially mistakes for a boy. Lane takes Angela out drinking and the two quickly become friends. After meeting her briefly when she spends the night Colin becomes infatuated with her and the two sleep together.

In the meantime, Christina slowly recovers and starts to remember the events, but has limited mental capabilities. The four (Colin, Lane, Angela, and Christina) go on a trip to a forest, where Christina stands up from the wheelchair and starts to walk again with the help of Lane, who confesses she is very sorry for the accident and tries to help her make her first steps again. The two women walk to a wooden overlook built above a cascade, and Christina pushes an absent-minded Lane over the overlook's handrail and into the abyss. The entire scene is watched by Angela from a distance, who then runs to the spot, looks at the collapsed Christina, then down the whirling cascade waters, but cannot see whether Lane has survived or not. This is where the film ends.

Cast
 Marcia Gay Harden as Lane
 Donogh Rees as Christina
 Caitlin Bossley as Angela Iseman
 William Zappa as Colin Iseman
 Pete Smith as Horse
 Jon Brazier as Arthur
 Geoffrey Southern as Patient
 Shirley Wilson as Intensive care nurse
 Denise Lyness as Physiotherapy nurse
 Jennifer Karehana as Physio nurse
 David Stott as Stephen
 Harata Solomon as Aunty Bet
 Caroline De Lore as Colleen
 Trish Howie as Nurse
 Phil McLachlan as Ward sister
 Wayne McGoram as Nurse (as Wayne McCoram)

Music
Composer:  Antony Partos
Orchestrator:  Derek Williams
Conductor:  Dobbs Franks
Musicians:  Australian Opera and Ballet Orchestra

Awards
New Zealand Film and TV Awards (I) 1993

Film award wins
Best Female Dramatic Performance:  Caitlin Bossley
Best Female Supporting Performance:  Donogh Rees
Best Soundtrack:  Greg Bell, Kit Rollings, Mike Hopkins
Best Film Score:  Antony Partos

References

External links

NZ On Screen page
Crush (1992) at New Zealand Feature Film Database

1992 films
1992 drama films
New Zealand drama films
Films directed by Alison Maclean
1992 directorial debut films
1990s English-language films